The 1969 NAIA football season was the 14th season of college football sponsored by the NAIA.

The season was played from August to November 1969, culminating in the 1969 NAIA Championship Bowl, played this year on December 13, 1969 in Kingsville, Texas.

Texas A&I defeated  in the Championship Bowl, 32–7, to win their second NAIA national title.

Following the season, the NAIA split its football championship into Division I and Division II.

Conference realignment

Conference changes
 This was the final season for the Oregon Collegiate Conference. After the end of play, its four remaining members, all from Oregon, would depart to join the Evergreen Conference. The expanded conference would include eight members from Oregon and Washington.

Membership changes

Conference standings

Postseason

See also
 1969 NCAA University Division football season
 1969 NCAA College Division football season

References

 
NAIA Football National Championship